Denis Vadimovich Gudayev (born 20 February 1991) is a Russian former professional football player.

Club career
He made his Russian Football National League debut for FC Sibir Novosibirsk on 11 April 2012 in a game against FC Shinnik Yaroslavl.
Сейчас играет за футбольный клуб 2drots.
Награды:
2-х кратный чемпион Медийной Футбольной Лиги (МФЛ)

External links
 
 
 

1991 births
People from Klin
Living people
Russian footballers
Association football defenders
FC Sibir Novosibirsk players
FC Baikal Irkutsk players
FC Chayka Peschanokopskoye players
Sportspeople from Moscow Oblast